The UK Singles Chart is one of many music charts compiled by the Official Charts Company that calculates the best-selling singles of the week in the United Kingdom. Before 2004, the chart was only based on the sales of physical singles. This list shows singles that peaked in the top 10 of the UK Singles Chart during 1962, as well as singles which peaked in 1961 and 1963 but were in the top 10 in 1962. The entry date is when the single appeared in the top 10 for the first time (week ending, as published by the Official Charts Company, which is six days after the chart is announced).

Ninety-two singles were in the top ten in 1962. Seven singles from 1962 remained in the top 10 for several weeks at the beginning of the year, while "(Dance With The) Guitar Man" by Duane Eddy & the Rebelettes, "Rockin' Around the Christmas Tree" by Brenda Lee and "The Next Time"/"Bachelor Boy" by Cliff Richard and The Shadows were all released in 1962 but did not reach their peak until 1963. "Moon River" by Danny Williams with Geoff Love and His Orchestra, "Midnight in Moscow" by Kenny Ball & His Jazzmen and "Stranger on the Shore" by Mr Acker Bilk were the singles from 1961 to reach their peak in 1962. Twenty-three artists scored multiple entries in the top 10 in 1962. Chubby Checker, The Four Seasons, Frank Ifield, Joe Brown and Tommy Roe were among the many artists who achieved their first UK charting top 10 single in 1962.

The 1961 Christmas number-one, "Moon River" by Danny Williams, remained at number one for the first two weeks of 1962. The first new number-one single of the year was "The Young Ones" by Cliff Richard and The Shadows. Overall, twelve different singles peaked at number-one in 1962, with Elvis Presley (4) having the most singles hit that position.

Background

Multiple entries
Ninety-two singles charted in the top 10 in 1962, with eighty-five singles reaching their peak this year. "When My Little Girl is Smiling" was recorded by Craig Douglas and Jimmy Justice and both versions reached the top 10.

Twenty-three artists scored multiple entries in the top 10 in 1962. The Shadows secured the record for most top 10 hits in 1962 with six hit singles, four of which were with Cliff Richard.

Frank Ifield was one of a number of artists with two top-ten entries, including the number-one single "I Remember You". Adam Faith, Bobby Darin, Duane Eddy, Karl Denver and Neil Sedaka were among the other artists who had multiple top 10 entries in 1962.

Chart debuts
Twenty-five artists achieved their first top 10 single in 1962, either as a lead or featured artist. Bernard Cribbins, Frank Ifield and Jimmy Justice all had one other entry in their breakthrough year.

The following table (collapsed on desktop site) does not include acts who had previously charted as part of a group and secured their first top 10 solo single.

Notes
British vocal group The Tornados were Billy Fury's backing group from the start of this year until August 1963 but they did not receive specific credit for these recordings. Their first official chart credit was "Telstar" under their own name.

Songs from films 
Original songs from various films entered the top 10 throughout the year. These included "The Young Ones" (from The Young Ones), "Rock-A-Hula Baby" and "Can't Help Falling in Love" (Blue Hawaii), "The Ballad of Paladin" (The Wild Westerners), "The Next Time" and "Bachelor Boy" (Summer Holiday).

Additionally, the original version of "Love Letters" was nominated for the Academy Award for Best Original Song after being used in the film of the same name (losing out to "It Might As Well Be Spring" from State Fair). "The Green Leaves of Summer" was also Academy Award-nominated, appearing in the 1960 film The Alamo, where it was performed by The Brothers Four.

Best-selling singles
Until 1970 there was no universally recognised year-end best-sellers list. However, in 2011 the Official Charts Company released a list of the best-selling single of each year in chart history from 1952 to date. According to the list, "I Remember You" by Frank Ifield is officially recorded as the biggest-selling single of 1962.

Top-ten singles
Key

Entries by artist

The following table shows artists who achieved two or more top 10 entries in 1962, including singles that reached their peak in 1961 or 1963. The figures include both main artists and featured artists. The total number of weeks an artist spent in the top ten in 1962 is also shown.

Notes

 "Stranger on the Shore" re-entered the top 10 at number 8 on 21 March 1962 (week ending) for 5 weeks, at number 10 on 9 May 1962 (week ending) and at number 9 on 4 July 1962 (week ending) for 2 weeks.
 "Run to Him" re-entered the top 10 at number 6 on 21 February 1962 (week ending) for 2 weeks.
 The Shadows only appear on "Do You Want to Dance".
 "Green Leaves of Summer" re-entered the top 10 at number 7 on 11 July 1962 (week ending).
 "English Country Garden" re-entered the top 10 at number 8 on 18 July (week ending) for 4 weeks.
 "Telstar" re-entered the top 10 at number 10 on 23 January 1963 (week ending).
 "Let's Dance" re-entered the top 10 at number 10 on 2 January 1963 (week ending) for 2 weeks.
 "Sherry" re-entered the top 10 at number 10 on 12 December 1962 (week ending).
 Figure includes single that peaked in 1963.
 Figure includes single that peaked in 1961.
 Figure includes single that first charted in 1961 but peaked in 1962.

See also
1962 in British music
List of number-one singles from the 1960s (UK)

References
General

Specific

External links
1962 singles chart archive at the Official Charts Company (click on relevant week)

United Kingdom
1962
Top 10 singles